My Friend Irma Goes West is a 1950 American comedy film directed by Hal Walker and based on the radio show My Friend Irma. It stars the comedy team of Dean Martin and Jerry Lewis. The film is a sequel to My Friend Irma (1949) and was released on May 31, 1950 by Paramount Pictures.

Plot
Immediately after the events in My Friend Irma, Al is still trying to promote Steve's career. Eventually, he gets booked to a local television station and is spotted by a movie producer. He is offered a contract and Steve, as well as the rest of the gang, Irma, Jane and Seymour, all head to Hollywood.

The trip ends suddenly when the producer is discovered to be an escaped lunatic. Al tries to set things straight by taking the gang to Las Vegas to work at a casino, but things aren't as they seem. Irma causes havoc by wrecking a rigged roulette wheel, and she gets kidnapped and held for ransom until Al can raise $50,000.

Meanwhile, Seymour, dressed as an Indian brave, locates Irma and rescues her. The publicity received during the entire incident brings a movie offer for Irma and Seymour.

Cast
John Lund as Al
Marie Wilson as Irma Peterson
Diana Lynn as Jane Stacy
Dean Martin as Steve Laird
Jerry Lewis as Seymour
Corinne Calvet as Yvonne Yvonne
Lloyd Corrigan as Sharpie Corrigan
Gregg Palmer as Ambulance attendant
Don Porter as Mr. Brent

Production
My Friend Irma Goes West was filmed from January 31 through March 18, 1950. It was the second Martin and Lewis film to be released, preceding At War with the Army, which had been produced before My Friend Irma Goes West but was not released until December 1950.

Reception
In a contemporary review for The New York Times, critic Thomas M. Pryor wrote: "Jerry Lewis, the slight, abject, elastic young man, and his straight-man-accomplice with the velvety baritone singing voice, Dean Martin, are responsible for about ninety-nine and nine-tenths of the fun ... There is a marked reduction in the quality of the show when Martin and Lewis are off the screen and sometimes even they are victimized by the silly script. However, M. & L. are in there pitching most of the time and most of the time they are in top form. ... Without them, the film would not add up to anything. The story is a nondescript affair ... it's the interpretation that stirs up the fun in 'My Friend Irma Goes West.'"

Home media
My Friend Irma Goes West has been released twice on DVD. It was originally released as part of a two-film collection with My Friend Irma on October 25, 2005. It was also included in an eight-film DVD set, the Dean Martin and Jerry Lewis Collection: Volume One, released on October 31, 2006.

References

External links 

1950 films
1950 comedy films
American black-and-white films
American comedy films
American sequel films
1950s English-language films
Films scored by Leigh Harline
Films based on radio series
Films directed by Hal Walker
Films produced by Hal B. Wallis
Films set in the Las Vegas Valley
Paramount Pictures films
1950s American films